Nicolas Dragon (born April 19, 1977 in Laon) is a French politician of the National Rally and a member of the National Assembly representing Aisne's 1st constituency.

Dragon is of Polish descent and was born in Laon. He worked as a communications consultant and stated that he took an interest in politics at a young age. Dragon describes himself as a "social Gaullist" and supported the Rally for the Republic party in the 1990s. He later sought the nomination for the En Marche! candidacy for Aisne's 1st constituency ahead of the 2017 French legislative election, claiming he initially agreed with Emmanuel Macron's "concept of neither left nor right" but lost out to Aude Bono-Vandorme. He later renounced his support for Macron and has described him as a "globalist." He subsequently joined the National Rally and was elected as a municipal councilor for the party in Laon in 2020.

For the 2022 French legislative election, he again contented Aisne's 1st constituency for the National Rally and defeated Bono-Vandorme during the second round.

References

1997 births
Living people
National Rally (France) politicians
Deputies of the 16th National Assembly of the French Fifth Republic
French people of Polish descent
People from Laon
21st-century French politicians